New York State Route 45 (NY 45) is a north–south state highway in central Rockland County, New York, in the United States. It spans  from the village of Chestnut Ridge at the New Jersey–New York border, where it becomes County Route 73 (CR 73) in Bergen County, New Jersey, to U.S. Route 202 (US 202) in the town of Haverstraw. Though an interchange does exist between NY 45 and the Palisades Interstate Parkway, the route has no access to the New York State Thruway.

NY 45 was originally designated as New York State Route 305 as part of the 1930 renumbering of state highways in New York. It was renumbered to New York State Route 94 in the early 1940s before becoming NY 45 on January 1, 1949.

Route description

NY 45 begins at the New Jersey–New York border in Chestnut Ridge. Although the first NY 45 reassurance shield is a quarter-mile north of the state line, the reference marker below the "Welcome to New York" sign at the crossing indicates the beginning of NY 45.

NY 45 runs parallel to the small portion of the Garden State Parkway (GSP) that enters New York. Officially this portion is considered an extension of the New York State Thruway. While NY 45 never intersects the GSP, it provides a link to the parkway. South of the New Jersey border in Bergen County, CR 73 intersects the GSP, and in New York, NY 45 intersects CR 41, which intersects the parkway. Through Chestnut Ridge (where it is known as Chestnut Ridge Road, just as CR 73, its southern extension, is in New Jersey), it crosses the New York State Thruway.

Once it enters Spring Valley (where it is known locally first as South Main Street, then as North Main Street after it crosses its very busy intersection with NY 59), NY 45 continues northward through the downtown business district. Traffic here tends to pile up many times a day. After NY 45's intersection at Hillcrest with CR 74 (the location of several small shopping centers), traffic tends to ease up. North of there, NY 45 provides a link to the Hassidic Jewish community of New Square, although it never enters the village limits. At CR 80, NY 45 enters New Hempstead. Again the road becomes relatively quiet, but it begins to parallel the Palisades Interstate Parkway, until its intersection at exit 12 in Pomona. NY 45 quickly leaves Pomona and enters Mount Ivy. This is where NY 45 comes to its northern terminus at US 202.

History
What is now NY 45 was originally designated NY 305 as part of the 1930 renumbering of state highways in New York. At the same time, the portion of modern NY 305 north of Portville in Cattaraugus and Allegany counties was assigned NY 94, while the current NY 94 in Orange County was designated NY 45. The NY 305 and NY 94 designations were swapped in the early 1940s, placing NY 305 on its current alignment and NY 94 on what is now NY 45. NY 94 was then swapped again, this time for NY 45, on January 1, 1949, placing both routes on their modern routings.

In 1958, Ramapo town engineer Edwin Wallace noticed an increase in the amount of traffic passing through the village of Spring Valley. This led Wallace to propose a  bypass of the village, starting at NY 59 in Monsey and ending at NY 45 in Hillcrest. Rockland County approved the proposed bypass two years later, and the plans were forwarded to the New York State Department of Transportation. In 1966, the Tri-State Transportation Commission released its long-term highway report for the area. The new study replaced the Spring Valley Bypass with the NY 45 expressway, a north–south bypass of Spring Valley connecting the Garden State Parkway to the Palisades Interstate Parkway. The road would serve a steadily growing area of commercial businesses along the NY 45 corridor. No action was taken on this proposal.

Major intersections

See also

References

External links

045
Transportation in Rockland County, New York